Events in the year 2015 in the capital city of India, Delhi

Incumbents

General Elections

Legislative Assembly
2015 Delhi Legislative Assembly elections was declared on 10 February 2015.

Events

January

February
 7 February : Legislative Assembly elections was held. 
 10 February : The results of the Legislative Assembly elections were announced.
 14 February : Arvind Kejriwal became the chief minister of Delhi.

References

Delhi
Delhi
2010s in Delhi